Niagara is a city in Grand Forks County, North Dakota, United States. It is part of the "Grand Forks, ND-MN Metropolitan Statistical Area" or "Greater Grand Forks". The population was 46 at the 2020 census. Niagara was founded in 1883.

Geography
Niagara is located at  (47.997001, -97.869353).

Demographics

2010 census
As of the census of 2010, there were 53 people, 23 households, and 15 families living in the city. The racial makeup of the city was 98.1% White and 1.9% from two or more races. Hispanic or Latino of any race were 1.9% of the population.

There were 23 households, of which 39.1% had children under the age of 18 living with them, 52.2% were married couples living together, 13.0% had a male householder with no wife present, and 34.8% were non-families. 30.4% of all households were made up of individuals, and 21.7% had someone living alone who was 65 years of age or older. The average household size was 2.30 and the average family size was 2.87.

The median age in the city was 46.5 years. 24.5% of residents were under the age of 18; 5.7% were between the ages of 18 and 24; 18.9% were from 25 to 44; 32% were from 45 to 64; and 18.9% were 65 years of age or older. The gender makeup of the city was 58.5% male and 41.5% female.

2000 census
As of the census of 2000, there were 57 people, 27 households, and 18 families living in the city. The population density was 61.2 people per square mile (23.7/km). There were 35 housing units at an average density of 37.6 per square mile (14.5/km). The racial makeup of the city was 94.74% White, 1.75% Native American, and 3.51% from two or more races.

There were 27 households, out of which 14.8% had children under the age of 18 living with them, 55.6% were married couples living together, 7.4% had a female householder with no husband present, and 33.3% were non-families. 25.9% of all households were made up of individuals, and 14.8% had someone living alone who was 65 years of age or older. The average household size was 2.11 and the average family size was 2.50.

In the city, the population was spread out, with 17.5% under the age of 18, 1.8% from 18 to 24, 22.8% from 25 to 44, 29.8% from 45 to 64, and 28.1% who were 65 years of age or older. The median age was 54 years. For every 100 females, there were 96.6 males. For every 100 females age 18 and over, there were 88.0 males.

The median income for a household in the city was $30,000, and the median income for a family was $31,250. Males had a median income of $20,625 versus $16,750 for females. The per capita income for the city was $16,206. There were no families and 6.4% of the population living below the poverty line, including no under eighteens and none of those over 64.

References

External links
 Niagara Community Historical Society, Niagara, North Dakota, organized 1967 : historical booklet (1973) from the Digital Horizons website

Cities in North Dakota
Cities in Grand Forks County, North Dakota
Populated places established in 1883
1883 establishments in Dakota Territory